Lena Jensen (born 29 January 1973 in Tromsø) is a Norwegian politician for the Socialist Left Party (SV). She was elected to the Norwegian Parliament from Troms in 2001.

She served as a member of the Tromsø municipality council from 1995 to 2001.

Parliamentary Committee duties 
2005–2009: member of the Standing Committee on Education, Research and Church Affairs
2005–2009: deputy member of the Electoral Committee
2001–2005: member of the Standing Committee on Education, Research and Church Affairs

External links

1973 births
Living people
Socialist Left Party (Norway) politicians
Members of the Storting
Women members of the Storting
Politicians from Tromsø
21st-century Norwegian politicians
21st-century Norwegian women politicians